Alpern is a surname. Notable people with the name include:

Anne X. Alpern (1903–1981), American jurist and politician
Anita Alpern (1920–2006), American government administrator 
Mathew Alpern (1920–1996), American physiologist
Merry Alpern (born 1955), American photographer 
 Ruth Alpern Madoff (born 1941), American wife of Bernie Madoff
Sara Alpern (born 1942), American historian
Steve Alpern, American mathematician